Georg Albrecht of Saxe-Weissenfels, Count of Barby (b. Dessau, 19 April 1695 – d. Barby, 12 June 1739), was a German prince of the House of Wettin and the last count of Barby.

He was the sixth (but second surviving) son of Heinrich of Saxe-Weissenfels, Count of Barby, and Princess Elisabeth Albertine of Anhalt-Dessau.

Life

Before his own birth, two older brothers (both named Johann August and stillborn twins) had died. The death of his oldest surviving brother, the Hereditary Prince Frederick Heinrich, during a trip to The Hague (21 November 1711) made him the new heir of the county of Barby.

In Forst, Niederlausitz, on 18 February 1721, Georg Albrecht married Duchess Auguste Louise of Württemberg-Oels. Auguste's maternal grandmother was Justine Sophie of Barby-Mühlingen, a sister of the last count; this brought Georg Albrecht closer connection to the former ruling house of Barby. The marriage was extremely unhappy, and the couple finally divorced in 1732 after eleven years of childless union. Auguste Luise returned to her Silesian homeland and died six months before Georg Albrecht. Neither remarried.

Georg Albrecht succeeded his father as count when Heinrick Albrecht died on 16 February 1728. As count of Barby, Georg Albrecht continued to govern in the same way as his late father. However, he died after only 11 years of governing. Because he died without issue, the Barby line of the Wettin family became extinct and the county of Barby passed to the Electorate of Saxony.

He was buried in the new family vault built by his father in Barby.

References
300 Jahre Schloß Neu-Augustusburg, 1660–1694 – Residenz der Herzöge von Sachsen-Weißenfels. Festschrift., Weissenfels, 1994.
Friedrich Gerhardt: Die Geschichte von Weißenfels a. S. mit neuen Beiträgen zur Geschichte des Herzogtums Sachsen-Weißenfels., Weissenfels 1907, p. 215.
Johann Christoph Dreyhaupt: Beschreibung des...Saal-Creyses, insonderheit der Städte Halle. Halle, 1749/1751 (d.i. "Dreyhaupt-Chronik")
Anton Balthasar König: Biographisches Lexikon aller Helden und Militärpersonen, vol. 3, p.336. [Retrieved 23 November 2014].

1695 births
1739 deaths
People from Dessau-Roßlau
House of Saxe-Weissenfels
Dukes of Saxe-Weissenfels
Albertine branch
Recipients of the Order of the White Eagle (Poland)